Pahasapasaurus is a genus of plesiosaur. It was an early polycotylid plesiosaur from the Cenomanian of South Dakota, USA.  Distinctive features of the taxon include elongate epipodial bones (radius/ulna - tibia/fibula) and the nature of the palate bones (roof of the mouth). The type species is P. haasi.

See also

 List of plesiosaur genera
 List of plesiosaurs
 Timeline of plesiosaur research

References

Late Cretaceous plesiosaurs of North America
Fossil taxa described in 2007
Fossils of the United States
Sauropterygian genera